Hood is the second novel written by Irish-Canadian author Emma Donoghue, published in 1995.  The book was the recipient of the 1997 Stonewall Book Award and is heavily influenced by James Joyce's Ulysses.

Publication History 
First published in the U.S. in 1995 and most recently published by HarperCollins in 2011.

Plot Summary 
This novel takes place in the seven days after Pen O'Grady's lover, Cara Wall, has been killed in a car accident. The two had been together for thirteen years, after meeting as schoolgirls in a Catholic school in Dublin. The story combines flashbacks giving the history of Pen and Cara's complex and tumultuous relationship with details of the various ways Pen feels and responds to grief, the reactions of people who do or don't know the nature of the relationship, Pen's feelings about lesbians in Ireland, and several decisions to come out to those close to her.

Awards 
Stonewall Book Award 1997

Reception 
Shortly after release, Hood was reviewed in the New York Times and Boston Globe. The New York Times called it  "charming" and said Donoghue "dip[s] into the ordinary with control and the occasional sustaining descriptive flashes of a born writer". Kirkus Reviews called it "profoundly moving," "an elegiac reconstruction of a long love affair," and a "spare, powerful narrative".

Major Themes 
This novel is about a semi-closeted lesbian in Ireland. Scholarly writing about Hood has noted themes of Catholicism, closets, and the home.

References

1995 Canadian novels
Novels by Emma Donoghue
Novels with lesbian themes
1990s LGBT novels
Hamish Hamilton books
Stonewall Book Award-winning works
Irish LGBT novels